John Lawrence (1618–1699) was Mayor of New York City from 1672 to 1674, and again in 1691.

Life
Thomas Lawrence, the first known Lawrence to arrive in the US landed at Plymouth, Massachusetts in 1635, and later removed to Ipswich, Massachusetts and later to Long Island. In 1644, he was one of the patentees of Hempstead under grant by Dutch Colonial Governor Willem Kieft. In 1645, Kieft granted the patent of Flushing to Lawrence and 16 others, which was confirmed by English Colonial Governor Richard Nicolls in 1666.

In 1658, Lawrence removed to New Amsterdam. New Amsterdam was renamed New York on September 8, 1664, in honor of the Duke of York (later James II of England), in whose name the English had captured it.

In 1663, he was appointed by Governor Pieter Stuyvesant as a Commissioner to negotiate with the General Court at Hartford to determine the boundary between New England and New Netherland.

Thomas' brother John Lawrence was one of the first aldermen of New York City when the city was incorporated in 1665. John Lawrence was Mayor of New York City from 1673 to 1675 and again in 1691. (Seventh and nineteenth NYC Mayor) He was a justice of the Supreme Court of the Province of New York from 1692 until his death.

John Lawrence married Susanna, and they had six children, among them John Lawrence who married Mrs. Sarah Willett; Susanna Lawrence who was married first to Mayor Gabriel Minvielle, and second to Alderman William Smith; and Mary (daughter of John Lawrence) who married William Whittinghame in 1660 (for account of whose ancestry see collections of Historical Society of Massachusetts).

Mary, a daughter by this marriage, distinguished by her literary acquirements, and the gifts she bestowed upon Harvard and Yale Colleges, was the wife of Gurdon Saltonstall, governor of Connecticut, and died 1730. — See notice of her in Knaps Female Biography, p. 453.

Sources
Historical Genealogy of the Lawrence Family by Thomas Lawrence (1858; pages 21f)
 History of Thomas Lawrence
List of mayors of New York City Mayors of New York City
 Historical Genealogy of the Lawrence Family Pdf

1618 births
1699 deaths
Mayors of New York City
New York City Council members
People from St Albans
17th-century English people
People of the Province of New York